The 1966–67 season was Chelsea Football Club's fifty-third competitive season.

Summary
Chelsea enjoyed a bright start to campaign and were unbeaten in their opening ten league matches. However, results dipped after striker Peter Osgood suffered a broken leg in a League Cup match against Blackpool in October. Osgood was replaced by Tony Hateley, the club's first £100,000 signing, but Hateley struggled for form and the club ultimately finished 9th in the First Division. They also reached the FA Cup Final for the first time since 1915, losing 2–1 to Tottenham Hotspur.

Table

References

External links
 1966–67 season at stamford-bridge.com

1966–67
English football clubs 1966–67 season